Two Lost Worlds is a 1951 science fiction/adventure film directed by Norman Dawn and starring James Arness and Laura Elliott.  The film was produced independently by Boris Petroff (dba Sterling Productions Inc.) from his original story. The film was scripted by Phyllis Parker (with later, added scenes written by Tom Hubbard and voice-over narrative by Bill Shaw), and distributed by Eagle-Lion Classics Inc., with a 1952 reissue by Classic Pictures Inc.

Plot
The year is 1830. The American clipper ship, the Hamilton Queen, is attacked by pirates in the New Hebrides (present day Vanuatu). The ship's mate Kirk Hamilton is wounded and heads to Queensland, Australia for medical treatment. While at the hospital, he meets and falls in love with Elaine Jeffries (Rogers), the fiancée of Martin Shannon a rancher. A romantic rivalry develops and the pirates, who attacked Kirk and his ship kidnap her along with her friend, Nancy Holden. Kirk and Shannon pursue the pirates and they soon wind up on a volcanic island inhabited by dinosaurs.

Cast
Kasey Rogers (as Laura Elliott) as Elaine Jeffries 
James Arness (as Jim Aurness) as Kirk Hamilton 
Bill Kennedy as Martin Shannon 
Gloria Petroff as Janice Jeffries
Pierre Watkin as Magistrate Jeffries 
Tom Hubbard as John Hartley 
Jane Harlan as Nancy Holden
Tom Monroe as Captain Tallman
Michael Rye as Captain Hackett 
Fred Kohler, Jr. as Nat Mercer - Sailor

Production
There are no original dinosaur effects in the film. The dinosaurs appear 58 minutes into the film. They were taken from stock footage recycled from the film One Million B.C. (1940).

The film was shot in Red Rock Canyon State Park (California) in Cantil, California.

See also
1950 in film

External links

1950s science fiction adventure films
American science fiction adventure films
Films about dinosaurs
Eagle-Lion Films films
Lost world films
Films directed by Norman Dawn
Films set in Oceania
American black-and-white films
1950s English-language films
1950s American films